Slovenian airline Adria Airways operated the following scheduled services at the time of its bankruptcy in September 2019.

Destinations

Notes

References

Lists of airline destinations
Destinations